USS Dunlin (AM-361) was an  built for the United States Navy during World War II. She earned three battle stars in service in the Pacific during World War II. In May 1946, she was turned over to the Republic of China for service with the Chinese Maritime Customs Service. Her fate is unreported in secondary sources.

Career 
Dunlin was launched 26 August 1943 by Willamette Iron and Steel Corp., Portland, Oregon; sponsored by Mrs. Ernest E. Lissy; and commissioned 16 February 1945.

Dunlin arrived at Guam from San Pedro, California, 7 June 1945. Ten days later she sailed for Okinawa to join in sweeping operations in the East China Sea in coordination with the U.S. 3rd Fleet strikes against Japan. On 6 September Dunlin left Okinawa to sweep the approaches to Sasebo and Nagasaki. Between 20 September and 31 October she cleared Bungo Suido area and after an escort voyage between Hiro Wan and Kure, arrived at Sasebo 20 November to unload her minesweeping gear and supervise Japanese minesweepers operating in Ozue and Ariake bays.

Dunlin put out from Sasebo 18 January 1946 for Pusan, Korea, arriving the next day. She checked the harbor for acoustic mines, then carried cargo from Chinhae for Allied vessels at Fusan. She was at Sasebo from 1 February until 4 March, then escorted four YMSs by way of Hong Kong to Subic Bay arriving 18 March.

She was demilitarized there and sailed to Shanghai, China, arriving 22 April. Dunlin was decommissioned 29 May 1946 and turned over to the Foreign Liquidation Committee of the State Department for transfer to the Chinese Maritime Commission.

Dunlin received three battle stars for World War II service.

References

External links 
 

Admirable-class minesweepers
Ships built in Portland, Oregon
1943 ships
World War II minesweepers of the United States

Ships of the Chinese Maritime Customs Service